This is a list of past and present rolling stock used on the Fairbourne Railway, a  narrow gauge preserved railway line running for  from Fairbourne on the Mid-Wales coast to Barmouth Ferry on a spit of sand in the Mawddach Estuary opposite the town of Barmouth . The line was opened as a horse-drawn tramway in 1895 to carry building materials for Fairbourne village. Passenger carriages were introduced shortly afterwards to connect with the ferry to Barmouth. The line was converted to a  steam railway in 1916 and became a successful tourist attraction. The line underwent another gauge conversion in 1985. The track was relayed at  gauge and new rolling stock was introduced.

Current stock (12¼ inch gauge)

The railway has a fleet of four steam locomotives which haul most of the passenger services. The steam locomotives are approximately half-size replicas of famous narrow gauge prototype locomotives such as the Class B Tanks from the Darjeeling Himalayan Railway and the Manning Wardle Tanks of the Lynton and Barnstaple Railway. Two diesel locomotives and a battery electric shunter are used for engineering trains.

Steam locomotives

Diesel locomotives

Carriages

The railway has a fleet of 22 passenger carriages, most of which are wooden bodies examples originating from the Réseau Guerlédan railway in France. The standard livery is blue.  The fleet compromises of 3 semi open balcony coaches, 1 semi open standard coach, 3 fully open toast-rack coaches, 2 opens ex Butlins, 9 closed carriages, 1 wheelchair accessible closed carriage, 2 brake vans/saloons and 1 brake van/wheelchair accessible coach.

Wagons

There are a small pool of goods vehicles in use for engineering works.

Former locomotives

12¼ Inch Gauge

15 Inch Gauge

Between 1916 and 1985, the railway had a variety of steam and internal combustion locomotives from a variety of different manufacturers including Bassett Lowke and Guest Engineering. Following the re-gauging of the line in the 1980s, most of the  gauge left the site and many have been restored and can be found working on other 15 inch lines around the world.

18 Inch Gauge

External links
Fairbourne Railway website

Fairbourne Railway
Fairbourne Railway
Fairbourne Railway

References